The Ajax Merchants are a defunct Tier II Junior "A" ice hockey team from Ajax, Ontario, Canada. They were a part of the Ontario Provincial Junior A Hockey League.

History
This Ajax franchise, much like its ancestor the Ajax Attack, was not known for its success.  The Steelers/Knob Hill Farms/Merchants tried different names, sponsors, and even tried a scenery change in the neighbouring town of Whitby, Ontario.  With only one winning season in five years, the team disbanded in 1977.

Season-by-season results

Playoffs
 1973 Lost Quarter-final
Richmond Hill Rams defeated Ajax Steelers
 1974 DNQ
 1975 Lost Quarter-final
North York Rangers defeated Whitby Knob Hill Farms
 1976 Lost Quarter-final
North York Rangers defeated Ajax Knob Hill Farms
 1977 DNQ

References
 HockeyDB - Ajax Merchants

1977 disestablishments in Ontario
Defunct ice hockey teams in Canada
Ice hockey teams in Ontario
Ajax, Ontario